Sydney Herbert Stewart Thompson (September 23, 1920 – November 26, 1997) was a merchant and served as a Social Credit Party of Canada Member of Parliament from 1957 to 1958.

Thompson first ran for a seat in the House of Commons of Canada for the 1957 Canadian federal election. He defeated incumbent Richmond Francis Hanna to win the Edmonton—Strathcona electoral district. Thompson was defeated a year later by Terry Nugent in the 1958 federal election.

References

External links
 

1920 births
1997 deaths
Members of the House of Commons of Canada from Alberta
People from Athabasca, Alberta
Social Credit Party of Canada MPs